Vojtech Mastny may refer to:

 Vojtěch Mastný (1874-1954), Czechoslovak diplomat
 Vojtech Mastny (historian) (born 1936), American historian

See also
 Vojtech Masný (born 1938), Slovak football player
 Mastny (disambiguation)